Kharitonovskaya is a rural locality (a village) in Ramenskoye Rural Settlement, Syamzhensky District, Vologda Oblast, Russia. The population was 23 as of 2002.

Geography 
Kharitonovskaya is located 41 km north of Syamzha (the district's administrative centre) by road. Ramenye is the nearest rural locality.

References 

Rural localities in Syamzhensky District